Elections to Glasgow City Council were held on 3 May 2007, the same day as the other Scottish local government elections and the Scottish Parliament general election. The election was the first one using 21 new wards created as a result of the Local Governance (Scotland) Act 2004, each ward elected three or four councillors using the single transferable vote system form of proportional representation. The new wards replaced 79 single-member wards which used the plurality (first past the post) system of election. It also saw the election of Glasgow's first councillors for the Scottish Greens and for Solidarity.

Election result 

Total votes cast: 187,916

Ward results

Ward 1: Linn (4 seats)

Ward 2: Newlands/Auldburn (3 seats)

Ward 3: Greater Pollok (4 seats)

Ward 4: Craigton (4 seats)

Ward 5: Govan (4 seats)

Ward 6: Pollokshields (3 seats)

Ward 7: Langside (3 seats)

Ward 8: Southside Central (4 seats)

Ward 9: Calton (3 seats)

Ward 10: Anderston/City (4 seats)

Ward 11: Hillhead (4 seats)

Ward 12: Partick West (4 seats)

Ward 13: Garscadden/Scotstounhill (4 seats)

Ward 14: Drumchapel/Anniesland (4 seats)

Ward 15: Maryhill/Kelvin (4 seats)

Ward 16: Canal (4 seats)

Ward 17: Springburn (3 seats)

Ward 18: East Centre (4 seats)

Ward 19: Shettleston (4 seats)

Ward 20: Baillieston (4 seats)

Ward 21: North East (4 seats)

Changes since 2007
†On 20 December 2007, Craigton Cllr Ruth Black left Solidarity and joined the Labour Party. On 9 February 2012 she resigned from the party and became an Independent.
††On 12 December 2008, Newlands/Auldburn Cllr Colin Deans left the Scottish National Party and joined the Labour Party. On 7 January 2009 he announced he would sit as an Independent and not join the Labour Party.
†††On 9 February 2010, Maryhill/Kelvin Cllr Alex Dingwall left the Scottish National Party and joined the Liberal Democrats.
††††In March 2011, Greater Pollok Cllr William O'Rourke was suspended from the Labour Party. He was expelled on 6 February 2012 and is now an Independent.
†††††On 30 January 2012 Pollokshields Cllr Irfan Rabbani resigned from the Labour Party and joined the Scottish National Party.
††††††On 2 February 2012 Govan Cllr Stephen Dornan resigned from the Labour Party and is now an Independent. 
†††††††On 8 February 2012 Southside Central Cllr Anne Marie Millar resigned from the Labour Party and is now an Independent. 
††††††††On 8 February 2012 Ballieston Cllr Andy Muir resigned from the Labour Party and is now an Independent.
†††††††††On 9 February 2012 Greater Pollok Cllr Tommy Morrison resigned from the Labour Party and is now an Independent.
††††††††††On 14 March 2012 Govan Cllr Shaukat Butt resigned from the Labour Party and is now an Independent.
†††††††††††On 27 March 2012 Canal Cllr Ellen Hurcombe resigned from the Labour Party and is now an Independent.

By-elections since 3 May 2007
On 18 September 2008, a by-election was held following the election of John Mason as an MP for Glasgow East on 25 July 2008. The by-election was won by the SNP's David Turner.

On 6 November 2008, a by-election was held following the death of Labour Cllr David Hay on 27 September 2008. The by-election was won by Labour's Andy Muir.††††††††

On 4 June 2009, a by-election was held following the resignation of SNP MSP Bill Kidd as a Councillor. The by-election was won by Labour's Anne McTaggart.

On 6 May 2010, a by-election was held following the resignation of Labour Councillor Stephen Purcell. The by-election was won by Labour's Christopher Hughes.

On 17 November 2011, a by-election was held following the death of SNP Councillor George Roberts. The seat was held by the SNP's Ken Andrew.

References

2007 Scottish local elections
2007
2000s in Glasgow